Bénédicte Duprez (born 8 August 1951) is a French former backstroke swimmer. She competed in two events at the 1968 Summer Olympics.

References

External links
 

1951 births
Living people
French female backstroke swimmers
Olympic swimmers of France
Swimmers at the 1968 Summer Olympics
Universiade medalists in swimming
Sportspeople from Tourcoing
Universiade bronze medalists for France